Urban Cleve (born 24 November 1930) is a German middle-distance runner. He competed in the men's 800 metres at the 1952 Summer Olympics.

References

1930 births
Living people
Athletes (track and field) at the 1952 Summer Olympics
German male middle-distance runners
Olympic athletes of Germany
Sportspeople from Dortmund